Matilda of Hungary is an opera in three acts composed by William Vincent Wallace to an English libretto by Alfred Bunn. It was first performed on 22 February 1847 at the Theatre Royal, Drury Lane, London, with Emma Romer in the title role. Unlike its predecessor, Wallace's first opera, Maritana, it was not a success and quickly vanished from the repertory.

Composition
Wallace's first opera, Maritana, had been produced in 1845 under the management of Alfred Bunn at the Theatre Royal, Drury Lane and went on to international success. Seeking to repeat its success, Bunn wrote a libretto, evidently based on a story of his own devising, about a fictional Queen of Bohemia. The hero's name was borrowed from a 15th-century king of Bohemia, George of Podiebrad, but the events depicted by Butt bear no resemblance to the historical figure's life. Wallace set the piece in a more ambitious musical style than he had used for Maritana, aiming at the manner of grand opera.

Productions
The opera opened at Drury Lane on 22 February 1847. The premiere had been scheduled for a week earlier, but was postponed at the last minute because the leading lady, Emma Romer, was taken ill. The delay caused great annoyance among some of the audience, but whetted public curiosity, and the first performance was given to a capacity audience.

Despite a tumultuous reception at the first night, the piece did not prove popular with the public. In March, Bunn added a ballet, Spanish Gallantries, as an after-piece. In April, Matilda was reduced to one performance a week, and other productions, including a revival of  Maritana, starring the same principal performers, were staged on the other nights. After April 1847, no further performances were advertised in the London papers.

Roles

Synopsis

Matilda of Hungary is the queen consort of King Ladislaus of Bohemia. He is missing, either killed or captured in battle by Turkish forces, and in his absence Matilda is striving to prevent a faction at court from seizing the throne. Fleeing the court, Matilda takes refuge in the mountains, followed by her Minister, Count Magnus. Seeking the throne for himself Magnus proposes marriage and is vehemently rejected by the queen.

Falling in with Podiebrad, a young mountaineer who happens to have an extraordinary likeness to the lost king, Magnus prevails on him to impersonate the missing king. Podiebrad has gallantly saved Matilda's life while hunting, and fallen in love with her without knowing her identity. When he realises that his beloved is the queen he agrees to perpetrate the fraud. He appears as the king, and is joyfully received by the people and by Matilda herself. At first she really believes that he is her husband, but when she realises the deception she goes along with it.

As king, Podiebrad leads his troops to victory and becomes immensely popular with his people. Count Magnus, finding that Podiebrad is not the puppet he planned for, forces an innkeeper, Mathias, to try to shoot the impostor. Mathias fails, and Magnus then seeks to make the deception known in the senate. Podiebrad admits that he is not the real Ladislaus, is nevertheless hailed as king by the senate, and is crowned king by Matilda. Magnus is sentenced to death.

Musical numbers

Act I
1. Chorus: "May Heaven protect the Queen"
2. Song – Mathias: "The Prophet his standard was rearing"
3. Recitative and air – Podiebrad: "One day I wandered. … It was a form"
4. Cavatina – Magnus: "She comes in all her loveliness"
5. Duet: Queen and Magnus: "What? shall my bright and spotless crown"
6. Chorus: "Before our Queen we kneel
7. Recitative and duet – Podiebrad and Magnus: "What form is that … It is my queen"
8. Ballad – Podiebrad: "Adieu – fair land"
9. Finale – Chorus, Magnus and Podiebrad: "The soldier silently doth stand"

Act II
10. Recitative and air – Queen: "At length in absence mourned"
11. Chorus: "This happy day we celebrate"
12. Chorus: "Long live the King"
13. Canon – Podiebrad, Magnus and Mathias: "The moment comes"
14. Barcarole – Podiebrad: "Like waves which o'er the ocean"
15. Ballad – Podiebrad: "Gonve is the calmness"
16. Duet – Podiebrad and Magnus: "O vengeance – rage and shame"
17. Chorus: "Thy fondest wish, they highest aim"
18. Romance – Queen: "They who would still be happy"
19. Duet – Podiebrad and Queen: "This deep affront I did not need"
20. Finale – Chorus, Ottokar, Mathias, Lillia, Podiebrad, Magnus and Queen: "The people, past assuaging"

Act III
21. Recitative – Lillia: "These halls of revels once the scene"
22. Ballad – Lillia: "A lovely youth, the mountain child"
23. Chorus and Podiebrad: "Oh, welcome with shouts"
24. Romance – Queen: "In that devotion which we breathe"
25, Chorus: "Suppress these giddy transports"
26. Trio – Magnus, Podiebrad and Mathias: "To see my king"
27. Duet – Queen and Podiebrad: "What do I hear?"
28. Ensemble – All: "Here by our laws for justice"
29. Rondo finale – Queen: "One gentle heart"

Source: libretto.

Critical reaction
The opera received lukewarm reviews. The Morning Post thought the libretto suffered from having an obscure and unfamiliar subject. John Bull commented, "We do not greatly object to mere improbability in the story of a drama especially a musical one; but, though a Drury-Lane grand serious opera is scarcely above the level of [a] melodrama yet neither the one nor the other should contain absurdities palpable to a child of ten years old." There was criticism that the character of Matilda was morally repugnant for receiving the attentions of Podiebrad while believing her real husband might be alive.

The music was no better received. Both The Morning Post and The Era found the overture far too long and poorly constructed. Wallace's music was judged "showy but superficial", lacking the freshness and novelty of the score of Maritana. The papers thought the ballads for the soprano and tenor to have nothing to do with the drama and everything to do with their sales as sheet music. In 2012 the critic Andrew Lamb wrote that Bunn's libretto has been dismissed as one of the worst ever written.

Notes

References
 

1847 operas
English-language operas
Operas by William Vincent Wallace
Operas